Duple may refer to:

Musical measure 
 Metre (music) the rhythmic structure of music
 Duple and quadruple metre a musical metre characterized by a primary division of 2 beats to the bar

Coachbuilding 
 Duple Metsec former British coachbuilders acquired by Duple Coachbuilders
 Duple Coachbuilders a coachbuilder that acquired Duple Metsec, later to become Hestair Duple
 Duple Dominant an intercity coach bodywork design
 Duple Dartline a single-decker bus body
 Duple 425 a coach design built by Hestair Duple in the late 1980s
 Dennis Dart a bus designed by Hestair Group, the owner of Duple and Dennis
 Hestair Group who absorbed Duple Coachbuilders and Dennis